Kiritsinhji Rana (born 7 July 1964) is currently Cabinet Minister of Forest, Environment, Climate Change, Printing and Stationery in Government of Gujarat. He is Member of Legislative assembly from Limbdi (Vidhan Sabha constituency) in Gujarat . He also served as Minister of Animal Husbandry from 1998 to 2002 and Minister of Forest and Environment from 2007 to 2012. He was also Secretary of Gujarat State (BJP) from 2003 to 2006. His village is Bhalgamda.

Early life
Kiritsinh Rana was born on 7 July 1964. He belongs to Rajput Family. His native village is Bhalgamda, Limbdi. 
Kiritsinh's father Jitubha Rana was a BJP worker and was elected MLA from Limbdi Vidhansabha in 1982 by polls and again in 1990 elections.

Political career
Elected MLA in 1995 and 1998 from Limbdi. 
Minister of Animal husbandry from 1998 to 2002.
Elected MLA in 2007. 
Minister of Forest and Environment from 2007 to 2012.
Elected MLA in 2013.
Elected MLA on 10 November 2020.
Appointed Incharge of Devbhoomi Dwarka District BJP in 2021.
Appointed Chairman of Panchayat Raj, Gujarat

Appointed Cabinet Minister of Forest and Environment on 16 September 2021.

Elected MLA on 8 December 2022.

References

Gujarat MLAs 2017–2022
Bharatiya Janata Party politicians from Gujarat
Living people
Gujarat MLAs 2007–2012
Gujarat MLAs 2012–2017
1964 births